Nicolás Arrechea (born 16 May 1991) is an Argentine professional footballer who plays as a centre-back for Brown de Adrogué.

Career
Arrechea's career started with Almagro. He made his professional debut on 11 September 2012 during a Primera B Metropolitana fixture with Villa San Carlos, which was the first of sixteen appearances in his debut campaign; prior to scoring his first senior goal against Defensores de Belgrano in September 2013. On 25 June 2017, Sol de América of the Paraguayan Primera División completed the loan signing of Arrechea. His first appearance arrived versus Olimpia on 22 July, which preceded his first goal against Independiente four appearances later. His stay with the club lasted parts of the 2017 and 2018 seasons.

Career statistics
.

References

External links

1991 births
Living people
People from Tres de Febrero Partido
Argentine footballers
Association football defenders
Argentine expatriate footballers
Expatriate footballers in Paraguay
Argentine expatriate sportspeople in Paraguay
Primera B Metropolitana players
Primera Nacional players
Paraguayan Primera División players
Club Almagro players
Club Sol de América footballers
Club Atlético Brown footballers
Sportspeople from Buenos Aires Province